Wolfgang Wenzel von Haffner (23 November 1806 – 11 September 1892) was a Norwegian naval officer and politician.

Early life and career
He was born in Christiania in 1806, as the son of Lieutenant Colonel Johan Friedrich Wilhelm Haffner and Sara Vilhelmine, née Hagerup. In 1834 in Ullensaker he married Louise Claudia le Normand Malthe (1806, Solum – 1872, Kristiania).

His career began in the navy. He became Sub-Lieutenant (second lieutenant or fenrik) in 1824, and Lieutenant in 1830. From 1839 to 1848 he had an interlude as a private tutor in Norwegian language and mathematics to the three eldest sons of Crown Prince Oscar of Sweden, namely Charles, Gustaf and Oscar. After this period, Haffner returned to the navy in 1848. He was promoted to Commodore in 1860.

Political career
In 1861 he entered politics. He was appointed chief of the Ministry of the Navy and Postal Affairs in December 1861, being the fourth person to hold that position that year. In October 1863 he left to serve as a member of the Council of State Division in Stockholm. The next year he returned as Minister of the Navy and Postal Affairs, only to return to Stockholm in 1867. He returned one final time to the Ministry of the Navy and Postal Affairs to head it from June 1868 to March 1869. During this final period, the Parliament of Norway became severely disappointed with monetary amounts granted to enlargement of Karljohansvern. Johan Sverdrup set forward a motion of no confidence, and this motion passed in what has been called a "foreplay of parliamentarism".

In May 1875, July 1875 and 1881 King Oscar II (whom Haffner had formerly tutored) appointed Haffner an acting member of the interim governments in Stockholm. Such interim governments were established when the King travelled abroad. On 21 March 1884, when Selmer's Cabinet fell due to the impeachment trial, Haffner was again named a member of the Council of State Division in Stockholm. He was also appointed acting Prime Minister in Stockholm, as the previous Prime Minister in Stockholm, Otto Richard Kierulf, went down in the Selmer impeachment case. Over Haffner, two people served as acting Prime Ministers in Kristiania: Ole Bachke from 11 to 29 March and Niels Mathias Rye from 29 March to 3 April 1884. On 3 April a new cabinet, Schweigaard's Cabinet, was finally constituted, and Haffner was relieved of both his positions. The Schweigaard's Cabinet lasted only two months, being replaced by the Liberal Sverdrup's Cabinet on 26 June.

Haffner died in his birth city in 1892. He was buried at Vår Frelsers gravlund.

References

1806 births
1892 deaths
Politicians from Oslo
Royal Norwegian Navy personnel
Government ministers of Norway
Burials at the Cemetery of Our Saviour
19th-century Norwegian politicians
Commanders Grand Cross of the Order of the Sword